Clarence B. Jamison (born 1857) was an American football, basketball, and track and field coach. He led the Purdue University men's basketball team from 1906 to 1908. He previously served as the head football coach and basketball coach at Rose-Hulman Institute of Technology in Terre Haute, Indiana.

References

1857 births
Year of death missing
Basketball coaches from Indiana
Rose–Hulman Fightin' Engineers football coaches
Rose–Hulman Fightin' Engineers men's basketball coaches
Purdue Boilermakers men's basketball coaches
Purdue Boilermakers track and field coaches
Sportspeople from Lafayette, Indiana